Ernest Thurtle (11 November 188422 August 1954) was an American-born British Labour politician.

Biography

Thurtle worked as an accountant and salesman. He saw service in the army in World War I and was badly wounded at the Battle of Cambrai. In 1912 he married Dorothy Lansbury, the daughter of George Lansbury, leader of the Labour Party in the 1930s.

Thurtle contested South West Bethnal Green and Shoreditch without success and was Member of Parliament (MP) for Shoreditch, London from 1923 to 1931 and from 1935 to 50, then Shoreditch and Finsbury from 1950 until his death.

Thurtle's greatest achievement in Parliament was to bring about the abolition of the death penalty for cowardice or desertion in the British Army. With over 300 British soldiers shot by firing squad after brief trials during World War I, Thurtle first introduced the measure for abolition in 1924, which became Labour Party policy in 1925 and eventually approved by the House of Commons by the Labour government in 1930. Supporters of the measure included T. E. Lawrence, also known as Lawrence of Arabia, but the abolition was first rejected by the House of Lords, which was encouraged in their resistance by various retired generals, including Lord Allenby. The House of Commons insisted, and the measure was enacted.

The argument that it would reduce the determination of the soldiers was countered by the fact that Australia had always made it clear when it joined the war effort that none of its men would be executed for these crimes. No Australians were shot for cowardice or desertion, but it was clear that their troops had been as effective as any others in the war. Thurtle continued to be involved in ex-servicemen's associations.

At the Labour Party conference in 1923, Thurtle supported two republican motions. The first stated "that the Royal Family is no longer a necessary party of the British constitution" and the second was "that the hereditary principle in the British Constitution be abolished".

Thurtle was a Parliamentary Private Secretary to the Minister of Pensions in 1924, a Labour whip from 1930 to 1931 and a junior minister at the Ministry of Information from 1941 to 1945. He was also a journalist and author.

Thurtle was General Secretary of the Rationalist Press Association 1932-40 and, in 1941, its Chairman.

References

External links 
 
 Shot at Dawn
 E Thurtle: Times winged chariot Chaterson, London, 1945

1884 births
1954 deaths
American emigrants to England
English republicans
English socialists
Hackney Members of Parliament
Labour Party (UK) MPs for English constituencies
Ministers in the Churchill wartime government, 1940–1945
People from Port Jervis, New York
People from New York (state)
UK MPs 1923–1924
UK MPs 1924–1929
UK MPs 1929–1931
UK MPs 1935–1945
UK MPs 1945–1950
UK MPs 1950–1951
UK MPs 1951–1955